Todd Ray, known professionally as T-Ray, is an American record producer and mixing engineer, known for producing Cypress Hill 1993 single "I Ain't Goin' Out Like That" and having founded the Venice Beach Freakshow in 2006, as well as creating and executive producing the TV Series Freakshow for AMC . He has also worked with the Beastie Boys, Biz Markie, MC Serch, Double X Posse, Kool G Rap, Bo$$, Funkdoobiest, MC Thick, The Whooliganz, Artifacts, Mick Jagger, Helmet, Korn, Audioslave, (həd)pe, Snot, Ugly Americans, G. Love & Special Sauce, Dilated Peoples and Non Phixion among others. He has won two Grammy Awards and a Latin Grammy Award for his work with Santana and Ozomatli and was nominated for a Grammy Award for "I Ain't Goin' Out Like That".

Early life
Todd Ray was born in Lancaster, South Carolina. As a teenager, in 1982, Todd fell in love with the early hip hop singles coming out of New York and began DJing and performing locally with friends. In 1986, he landed a record contract which led him to New York where he met his future wife, Danielle. He and Danielle ultimately moved to Los Angeles, settling in the suburbs to raise their two children.

Music production
Growing up in the rural South, Ray's living conditions and local entertainment options left much to be desired. After hearing a friend's copy of Afrika Bambaataa & the Soulsonic Force's "Planet Rock", Ray purchased a pair of turntables. He and his friends began performing locally. At this time, their group did not have a name and people would simply refer to them as 'those white boys'. Swatch Watch sponsored them, flying them to Breckenridge, Colorado, for one of the first ever snowboarding events, where Converse Sneakers reps provided additional sponsorship. Using his portion of the sponsorship money, T-Ray began building his record collection, which provided a solid foundation for his budding production skills. After mastering the concept of 'breaks', he quickly finished his group's first demo. A club in nearby Charlotte, North Carolina, was having a talent contest which Todd won several weeks in a row, which qualified him for the finals. The final competition was judged by representatives from Def Jam and PolyGram. Although Todd did not win the final competition, a PolyGram representative approached Todd with the offer of a record contract in 1986.

With the ink still drying on their deal, T-Ray and his group, moved straight from South Carolina to Rosedale, Queens, where they finished an album for Tin Pan Apple Records and appeared on the Fresh Fest Tour. But PolygGram's rival, Def Jam, quickly became a household name and by the summer of 1987, the group broke up. Todd eventually ran out of money and had to move back to South Carolina. With no rural job opportunities, and his pre-med scholarship lost, Todd worked non-stop on music production. Unable to afford even the floppy disks to save the beats, he would just record them on cassette.

Ray helped his family build furniture out of wood, which he dubbed 'folk art' furniture, with the tree bark still attached. People began paying handsomely for his chairs and he was able to save enough money to make the trip back to New York. Ray got a call back on his application as an intern at Big Beat Records. Todd played a tape of his beats for Craig Kallman and informed him "All I have is music". The morning after, Kallman called Todd (about Kenny Dope's promo for Red Alert) and told him "if you know how to make this [recorded loop] into a record, you've got a job". T-Ray was the producer of Big Beat Records' first hip-hop 12-inch, 'Supa Cat' (1991- Todd is credited on the album as 'The Mad Racket'). 'Supa Cat' sold 70,000 copies and was the true beginning of T-Ray's career as a producer. He went on to produce an entire album for Double X, with 'Not Gonna Be Able To Do It" (1992) becoming his first video. T-Ray produced 'I Aint Goin' Out Like That' for Cypress Hill's album Black Sunday (1993) and was nominated for a Grammy for it (Best Rap single). Todd then became closely affiliated with the DJ Muggs-led Soul Assassins producing for Cypress Hill and Funkdoobiest, among others.

By 1996, Todd had begun to produce rock & roll. His 1993 remix of House of Pain/Helmet collaboration (Judgement Night soundtrack) led to his producing of the entire Helmet album, which led to more rock gigs, including 311, KoЯn, Snot, Hed PE, John Spencer Blues Explosion and White Zombie. In 1999, T-Ray did production for Santana (which led to a Grammy Award in 2000 for Album of the Year) and a Latin group named Ozomatli who he won two other Grammys with, including a Latin Grammy- it was during this time that his life came full circle: "It was sort of like destiny in a way, for me to move from the woods to New York City," explains Todd Ray. "To get on as a producer, to go through turmoil, through hip-hop, and get to the point where I felt that people were doing hip-hop that I couldn't respect, so I moved to the West Coast to do rock & roll shit. I run into a group called Ozomatli who I wanted to do 'Incredible Bongo Beats' with. Their DJ just happened to be Cut Chemist, who I knew nothing about. But, as we're finishing the record he tells me this fucking story of how he was inspired by this fucking tape that he got from down South, and that tape was my fucking tape. The same tape I made in that shack, the same tape that I played for Craig when I met him at Big Beat. The same tape that I had played for the trees in Lancaster, South Carolina. I had made one copy for Eclipse (yes- that Eclipse), who originally lived in South Carolina too, who had sent it to an old friend in Rhode Island, who moved to L.A. and became one of the members of Jurassic 5, whose DJ just happened to be Cut Chemist. I felt like I had come 360 degrees!" [Elemental Magazine, Issue #62]

Venice Beach Freakshow
Ray founded the Venice Beach Freakshow in 2006. It quickly became known for its unique performers, as well as its large collection of oddity specimens. These included the world's largest collection of two-headed animals, including a two-headed chicken, a two-headed cow, and a pair of two-headed turtles, amongst others. While many specimens were dead, there were also around ten two-headed animals living in the Freakshow. This later led to the unscripted reality television show Freakshow, which depicted the lives of Ray, his family, and the show's performers. It ran for two seasons.

In 2017, it was announced that the Venice Beach Freakshow would be closing. This was after eight months of dispute with the building's new owners, Snapshot Partners, rumored to be associated with the Snapchat brand as part of the company's buy-up of Venice Beach property. Snapchat denied these claims, stating that they are unaffiliated with Snapshot Partners and was uninterested in the floor of the property in which the Freakshow was housed. Despite this, evidence shows that Snapchat did associate with Snapshot Partners in acquiring the building, which led to the Freakshow being a part of protests like #EvictSnapchat, fighting the gentrification of Venice Beach. The Venice Beach Freakshow's closing is considered by critics of gentrification to be part of the destruction of Venice Beach's culture, long known for its bodybuilders and graffiti artists. Others, however, see the gentrification of Venice Beach as simply the normal flow of the property market and the Freakshow as being a part of Venice's past.

Personal life
Ray is married to Danielle. They have a daughter, Asia, and a son, Phoenix.

Production discography

Remixes
Back To The Grill (12") Back To The Grill (Remix) Def Jam Recordings 1992
Losin' Myself (12") Losin' Myself (T-Ray's... Atlantic 1992
Our House (12", Promo) Turnstyle Records 1992
Sexual (CD, Maxi) Sexual (Safe Sex Mix),... Big Beat 1992
From The Brick Jungle (12") Bitch Control (Da Fell... Big Beat 1993
I Ain't Goin' Out Like That (12") Hits From The Bong Ruffhouse Records 1993
Judgment Night (Music From The Motion Picture) (12") Just Another Victim (T... Epic 1993
Just Another Victim (CD, Promo) Epic 1993
Swim (CD, Single, Ltd) Swim (T. Ray  Mix) Columbia 1993
The Program (12") The Program (Soul Assa... Mercury 1993
We Ain't Goin' Out Like That (12") Hits From The Bong (T-... Ruffhouse Records 1993
Who's The Man? (12") Put On Your Shit Kicke... Tommy Boy Music 1993
Wopbabalubop / Where's It At (12", Promo) Wopbabalubop (Soul Ass... Epic 1993
City Song (CD, Maxi) City Song (Supernatura... Grand Royal 1994
Deep Shag (12") Deep Shag (Sunny Ray Mix) Grand Royal 1994
Kickin Da Flava (CD) Citysong (Supernatural... EMI Music (Canada) 1994
Vibes - Strictly Hip Hop (CD) City Song (Supernatura... EMI Electrola 1994
Wilma's Rainbow EP (CD, Maxi) Just Another Victim (L... Interscope Records 1994
Omaha Stylee / 8:16 AM (T-Ray Mixes) (12") Capricorn Records 1995
Unreleased & Revamped EP (CD, EP) Hits From The Bong (T-... Columbia 1996
Go (Music From The Motion Picture) (CD) Shooting Up In Vain (T... Work 1999
Video Anthology (2xDVD) Alive (T-Ray Remix) Capitol Records 2000
Here To Stay (CD2) (CD, Maxi) Here To Stay (T Ray's ... Sony Music Entertainment (UK) 2002
Untouchables (CD, Album) Here To Stay (T Ray's ... Epic 2002
Be Yourself (CD, Maxi) Show Me How To Live (T... Interscope Records 2005
These Words (Remixes) (12", Promo) These Words (T Ray Rem... Epic 2005

Appears on
Back To The Grill (12") Daze In A Weak (LP Ver... Def Jam Recordings 1992
Judgment Night (Music From The Motion Picture) (CD) Come And Die Epic 1993
Sweet Thing (CD, Maxi) Sweet Thing (Extended ... Atlantic 1993
We Ain't Goin' Out Like That (12") Ruffhouse Records 1993
Wopbabalubop / Where's It At (12") Immortal Records (3) 1993
City Song (12") City Song (Supernatura... Grand Royal 1994
Unreleased & Revamped (EP) (CD, EP) Hits From The Bong (T-... Sony Music Entertainment (Australia) 1996
Calvin (CD, EP) Calvin Au Go Go 1998
Go (Music From The Motion Picture) (CD, Album) Shooting Up In Vain (T... Higher Ground, Sony Music Soundtrax 1999
Super Bowl Sundae (12") Almo Sounds 1999
U Can't Stop Hiphop (CD, Promo) I Ain't Going Out Like... Sony Music Media (Netherlands) 2002
Thicker Than Water (CD) Hobo Blues, Hobo Blues Brushfire Records 2003

Awards and nominations 

!
|-
|align=center|1999
|Supernatural
|Grammy Award for Album of the Year
|
|rowspan="2"| 
|-
|align=center|2004
|Street Signs
|Grammy Award for Best Latin Rock or Alternative Album
|
|-

References

Year of birth missing (living people)
Living people
Grammy Award winners
American audio engineers
American hip hop record producers
Record producers from South Carolina
People from Lancaster, South Carolina
People from Los Angeles
Mixing engineers